NPRI may refer to:

 National Pollutant Release Inventory
 Nevada Policy Research Institute 
 Naturopathic Physicians Research Institute